Classic Crystal is the second compilation album by American country music singer Crystal Gayle. 

Released in October 1979, the album spans Gayle's time on the United Artists Records label, which proved to be the height of her career. It peaked at #8 on the Billboard Country Music Albums chart, and #62 on the Billboard 200. It was certified Gold by the RIAA in 1980. 

In the United Kingdom, a 14 track modified version of the album was released in 1980 as The Crystal Gayle Singles Album. It included the recent UK singles 'We Should Be Together' and 'Too Deep For Tears' as well as 'High Time', 'River Road' and  'All I Wanna Do In Life'. 'I'll Do It All Over Again' was omitted. It reached #7 on the UK Album Chart (Gayle's first and only UK Top 10 album) and was certified Gold by the British Phonographic Industry.

Track listing

Crystal Gayle albums
1979 compilation albums
Albums produced by Allen Reynolds
Liberty Records compilation albums